Stuart Norris Wolfenden (1889 – 28 December 1938) was a linguist who worked at the University of California, Berkeley during the first part of the 20th century. During the New Deal he was titular head of the Sino-Tibetan philology project, which both Robert Shafer and Paul K. Benedict were directors of. In the 1970s the 'Stuart Wolfenden Society' was founded in his honor, together with a monograph series 'Occasional papers of the Wolfenden Society', in which James Matisoff published many of his early works.

Works of Wolfenden
1928. "The significance of early Tibetan word forms." Journal of the Royal Asiatic Society of Great Britain and Ireland (New Series) 60.4: 896-99.
1928. "The Prefix m- with Certain Substantives in Tibetan." Language 4.4:277-280.
1929. "On ok myit and she pok, with a proposed revision of the terminology of Burmese tones." Journal of the Burma Research Society 19.2: 57-66.
1929. Outlines of Tibeto-Burman linguistic morphology, with special reference to the prefixes, infixes and suffixes of classical Tibetan and the languages of the Kachin, Bodo, Nǎgǎ, Kuki-Chin and Burma groups. London: Royal Asiatic Society.
1929. Note on the tribal name Båṛå Fi-sā. Journal of the Royal Asiatic Society of Great Britain and Ireland (New Series) 61.3: 581-583.
1929. A further note on Båṛå Fi-sā. Journal of the Royal Asiatic Society of Great Britain and Ireland (New Series) 61.4: 869-870.
1931. On the Tibetan Transcription of Si-Hia Words. Journal of the Royal Asiatic Society of Great Britain and Ireland (New Series) 63.1: 47-52.
1931. Review of Tibetisch-Chinesische Wortgleichungen, Ein Versuch von Walter Simon. Reprinted from Mitteilungen des Seminars für Orientalische Sprachen, Bd. xxxii, Abt. 1. 9 7/8 + 6 ¾ inches. pp. 72. Berlin and Leipzig: Walter de Gruyter, 1930. Journal of the Royal Asiatic Society of Great Britain and Ireland (New Series) 63.1: 210-213.
1933. "Specimen of a Khambu dialect from Dilpa, Nepal." Journal of the Royal Asiatic Society of Great Britain and Ireland (New Series) 65.4: 845-56. [Khambu, Rungchenbong]
1934. "Specimen of the Sāngpāng Dialect." Acta Orientalia 12.1: 71-9.
1935. "A specimen of the Kūlung Dialect." Acta Orientalia 12.1: 35-43.
1934. "On the Prefixes and Consonantal Finals of Si-Hia as evidenced by their Chinese and Tibetan transcriptions." Journal of the Royal Asiatic Society of Great Britain and Ireland (New Series) 66.4: 745-770.
1934. Review of Dialects of Tibet; the Tibetan Dialect of Lahul, by Georges de Roerich. 10 x 7, pp 1 + 107. New York and Naggar, Kulu, Punjab: Urusvati Himalayan Research Institute of the Roerich Museum, n.d., 1933. Journal of the Royal Asiatic Society of Great Britain and Ireland (New Series) 66.4: 843-843.
1935. "Note on the tribal name Mes (Mech)." Journal of the Royal Asiatic Society of Great Britain and Ireland (New Series) 67.1: 145-146.
1935. "A specimen of the Thūlung Dialect." Journal of the Royal Asiatic Society of Great Britain and Ireland (New Series) 67.4: 629-53.
1936. "Notes on the Jyarong dialect of eastern Tibet. T'oung Pao ser. 2, 32.2/3:167-204.
1936. "On certain alternations between dental finals in Tibetan and Chinese." Journal of the Royal Asiatic Society of Great Britain and Ireland (New Series) 68.3: 401-416.
1937. "Concerning the variation of final consonants in the word families of Tibetan, Kachin and Chinese." Journal of the Royal Asiatic Society of Great Britain and Ireland (New Series) 69.4: 625-655.
1938. Review of A Dictionary of the Classical Newārī, by Hans Jørgensen. Det Kgl. Danske Videnskabernes Selskab Historisk-filologiske Meddelelser, XXIII, i. 9½ × 6, pp. 178. København: Levin and Munksgaard, 1936. Journal of the Royal Asiatic Society of Great Britain and Ireland (New Series) 70.3: 444-446.
1938. "Concerning the origins of Tibetan brgi̯ad and Chinese 八 'pwât'." T'oung Pao 34.3: 165-73.
1939. "On the restitution of final consonants in certain word types of Burmese." Acta Orientalia 17.2:153-168.

References

1938 deaths
Linguists from the United States
Historical linguists
Linguists of Sino-Tibetan languages
American orientalists
University of California, Berkeley faculty
1889 births
20th-century linguists